Surabaya–Gempol Toll Road is a toll road in East Java, Indonesia. This  highway connects Surabaya City in the north with Porong in the south. This toll road passes Surabaya and Sidoarjo. It is part of the Trans-Java Expressway.

History
The toll road has been operating since 1986, and has served as the primary access for Surabaya–Malang or Surabaya–Pasuruan routes, which are among East Java's main industrial areas.

Since August 2006, this toll road has been disrupted due to the mud flood event that inundated this toll road at a point  from Surabaya, specifically in Siring Village, Porong Sub-district, Sidoarjo Regency. The Porong–Gempol Toll Road is basically a relocation of Porong–Gempol segment of the Surabaya–Gempol Toll Road that was drowned by mud flow; it was inaugurated on 20 December 2018.

Toll gates

References

Toll roads in Indonesia
Surabaya
Transport in East Java
Sidoarjo Regency
Pasuruan Regency